Rye Creek is a stream in Franklin County in the U.S. state of Missouri. It is a tributary of the Meramec River.
 
Rye Creek was named for the fact wild rye lined its course.

See also
List of rivers of Missouri

References

Rivers of Franklin County, Missouri
Rivers of Missouri